So Kwun Wat is one of the 31 constituencies in the Tuen Mun District.

Created for the 2019 District Council elections, the constituency returns one district councillor to the Tuen Mun District Council, with an election every four years.

So Kwun Wat loosely covers areas like Siu Lam and So Kwun Wat. It has projected population of 13,828.

Councillors represented

Election results

2010s

Notes

References

So Kwun Wat
Constituencies of Hong Kong
Constituencies of Tuen Mun District Council
2019 establishments in Hong Kong
Constituencies established in 2019